Hà Giang is a city located on the banks of the Lô River in the Northeast region of Vietnam. It is the capital of Hà Giang Province. The city has an area of 135.33 km2 and a population of 55 559 inhabitants. The population is composed of 22 different ethnicities, of which 55.7% are Kinh and Tày people.

History
 
Up until the 19th century the settlement of Vị Xuyên, to the south of Hà Giang (chu Han: 河楊), was the principal market town in the area. Under the Nguyễn dynasty the town of Hà Giang, in what is now Trần Phú District, began to grow in size. In 1842 the town was included in the former Tuyên Quang Province. The town became an important French military outpost after 1886.

On August 12, 1991, the province of Hà Giang was re-established and separated from Tuyên Quang Province. When separated, Hà Giang Province contained 10 administrative units, and Hà Giang town became the provincial town of Hà Giang.

On September 27, 2010, Hà Giang town was officially upgraded into a provincial city.

In March 2014, the urban development project type II was approved by the Prime Minister in Decision No. 190, which includes the provinces of Vĩnh Phúc, Hà Giang, and Thừa Thiên–Huế, thanks to a non-refundable aid package from the Asian Development Bank (ADB). With regards to Hà Giang province, the project includes upgrading of roads, construction of 2 new bridges, and upgrading the sewage system. This investment in Hà Giang will promote economic and social sustainable development, a prerequisite for the development of the area.

Climate
Like most of northern Vietnam, Hà Giang has a dry-winter humid subtropical climate (Köppen Cwa).

Administration
The following administrative units are recognized as part of Hà Giang city:

 Trần Phú Ward
 Minh Khai Ward
 Nguyễn Trãi Ward
 Quang Trung Ward
 Ngọc Hà Ward 
 Phương Thiện
 Phương Độ
 Ngọc Đường

Economy
Hà Giang province is a highly mountainous region. Much of the province is too mountainous for agriculture, leaving much of the land covered by forests. Hà Giang's central plateau is good for growing plums, peaches, and persimmons, which the province exports. Tea is also grown.

Hà Giang is one of the poorest provinces of Vietnam. Traditionally, the vast majority of its economic activity revolved around agriculture and forestry, but in recent years, there have been attempts to establish a manufacturing industry. Infrastructure in Hà Giang has seen improvement, but remains poor – roads, schools, and health services are less developed than in many other parts of Vietnam. Since the designation of Dong Van Karst Plateau Geopark in 2010, the tourism industry has been growing.

Demographics
Many people in Hà Giang belong to one of Vietnam's ethnic minorities. Aside from the Viet (or Kinh), the most numerous ethnic groups in Hà Giang are the Tày, the Dao, and the Hmong.

References

Cities in Vietnam
Districts of Hà Giang province
Hà Giang province
Populated places in Hà Giang province
Provincial capitals in Vietnam